Penghu, also known as Pescadores in occidental documents, where is at eastern side of Taiwan Strait. Since the 17th century, there were 4 battles (or campaigns) involved Penghu.

Penghu
Penghu
Penghu
China history-related lists
Chinese history timelines
Penghu
Penghu
Penghu
Penghu